is a Japanese former ski jumper.

References

1969 births
Living people
Japanese male ski jumpers
Universiade medalists in ski jumping
Universiade gold medalists for Japan
Competitors at the 1991 Winter Universiade
Competitors at the 1993 Winter Universiade